Sideroflexin-1 is a protein that in humans is encoded by the SFXN1 gene. According to Nora Kory et al., SFXN1 gene product has mitochondrial serine transporter activity.

References

Further reading